The Boxing Mirror is a 2006 album by Alejandro Escovedo. released through Back Porch Records. Produced by John Cale of The Velvet Underground, the album finds Escovedo delving into the worlds of avant-rock and post-punk; and its darker sound has only shades of roots rock/Americana music in comparison with most Escovedo's alt-country records. Legendary bassist, Mark Andes (Spirit, Jo Jo Gunne, Firefall, Heart, Eliza Gilkyson, Jon Dee Graham, Ian McLagan), plays and sings back-up vocals.

Track listing 
All tracks composed by Alejandro Escovedo except as noted. 
 "Arizona" – 4:51
 "Dear Head on the Wall" (Kim Christoph, Alejandro Escovedo) – 3:40
 "Notes On Air" (Bukka Allen, Kim Christoff, Robbie Gjersoe, Brian Standefer) – 4:14
 "Looking For Love" – 4:08
 "The Ladder" – 2:55
 "Break This Time" – 4:04
 "Evita's Lullaby" – 4:23
 "Sacramento and Polk" – 4:54
 "Died a Little Today" – 3:46
 "Take Your Place" (Mark Andes, Alejandro Escovedo, Matt Fish, Jon Dee Graham, Hector Muñoz, David Pulkingham, Barry Salmon, Brian Standefer) – 3:19
 "The Boxing Mirror" – 5:43
 "Take Your Place" (Alternative Mix) (Andes, Escovedo, Fish, Graham, Muñoz, Pulkingham, Salmon, Standefer) - 3:11

Personnel 
 Alejandro Escovedo - acoustic and electric guitar, vocals
 John Cale - guitar, keyboards, producer
 Mark Andes - bass, backing vocals
 Jon Dee Graham - guitar
 Hector Muñoz - drums
 David Pulkingham - acoustic and electric guitar, backing vocals
 Matt Fish - cello
 Brian Standefer - cello
 Susan Voelz - violin, backing vocals
 Bruce Salmon - keyboards, backing vocals
 Otoño Lujan - accordion
 Wade Short - stand-up bass
 Wesley Kimler - cover painting, artwork
 Nita Scott - executive producer
 Michael Cano - paintings
 Heinz Geissler - executive producer, management
 Larry Goetz - bass, guitar, engineer, mixing
 Alan Yoshida - mastering

References 

Alejandro Escovedo albums
2006 albums
Albums produced by John Cale
Back Porch Records albums